Lu Leonard (born Mary Lou Price; June 5, 1926 – May 14, 2004) was an American actress, the daughter of Hal Price.

Career
She began acting in 1953 as Theodosia in the Life of Riley television sitcom. Her first major appearance was as the wife of Three Stooges member Larry Fine in the film Husbands Beware. Throughout the 1970s and 1980s, Leonard made television appearances on such shows as Laverne & Shirley, Mork & Mindy, The Facts of Life, Knight Rider and Married... with Children. Her most memorable was in a recurring role as William Conrad's wise-cracking secretary in Jake and the Fatman. She had small but memorable roles in Starman and Micki + Maude. One of Leonard's visible credits was playing the singing Angel Scribe II in the late 1960s Hallmark television musical special, The Littlest Angel.

During the 1970s and 1980s she became a regional celebrity in the Los Angeles Theatre circuit for her outrageous portrayal as a lesbian head matron in the play, Women Behind Bars. In 1982, she appeared as Oliver Warbucks' maid Mrs. Pugh in the film Annie (1982). She also performed voices in the Hanna-Barbera version of the 1990 animated TV series Bill & Ted's Excellent Adventures, and played Mrs. Chang in the 1990 live-action Aladdin television film.

Personal life
Lu Leonard never married or had children.

Death
Health problems (including diabetes) eventually set in and she left Hollywood in 1995, living primarily in Oregon. Lu eventually decided to move into the Motion Picture Country Home in Woodland Hills, California, where she spent her remaining years. She died of a heart attack on May 14, 2004, at age 77, and a bench in the Roddy McDowall garden at the Motion Picture Home has been dedicated in her memory.

References

External links

1926 births
2004 deaths
American film actresses
American television actresses
American voice actresses
People from Long Beach, New York
20th-century American actresses
American women singers
American women comedians
21st-century American women